HMS Seagull was a , and the first Royal Navy ship to be built entirely without rivets. She was completed on 30 March 1938.

She was adopted by the civil community of Christchurch, Hampshire after a successful Warship Week National Savings campaign in February 1942

During the Second World War she helped escort 21 Arctic convoys, and participated in Operation Neptune. She was also involved in the accidental sinking of the Polish submarine ORP Jastrząb, along with HNoMS St Albans, during the passage of Arctic Convoy PQ 15. Five crewmen were killed.
A court of Enquiry found that Jastrząb was  out of position, in an area where U-boats were expected to operate, and no blame could be attached to either commander.
However, other sources maintain the convoy changed its course and entered Jastrząb's patrol sector. Also that the Allied ships ignored identification marks, while on surface, and that Seagull's commander was later found guilty by the Admiralty.
These accounts are not reconcilable.

In late 1945 she was converted in Rotterdam to a Survey Ship. Until 1950 she operated in home waters, after which she was paid off into the reserve. She became the naval drill ship at Leith in 1955 before being scrapped by Demmelweek and Redding in Plymouth in 1956.

References

 

Halcyon-class minesweepers
Ships built in Plymouth, Devon
1937 ships
World War II minesweepers of the United Kingdom
Cold War minesweepers of the United Kingdom